Earnest Lee Hudson (born December 17, 1945) is an American actor. His roles include Winston Zeddemore in the Ghostbusters film series, Sergeant Darryl Albrecht in The Crow (1994), and Warden Leo Glynn on HBO's Oz (1997–2003). Hudson has also acted in the films Leviathan (1989), The Hand That Rocks the Cradle (1992), Airheads (1994), The Basketball Diaries (1995), Congo (1995), Miss Congeniality (2000), and as Principal Turner in The Ron Clark Story (2006).

Hudson had appeared in the television shows St. Elsewhere (1984), The Last Precinct (1986), 10-8: Officers on Duty (2003–2004), Desperate Housewives (2006–2007), The Secret Life of the American Teenager (2008–2013), Law & Order (2009–2010), the voice of Agent Bill Fowler in Transformers: Prime (2010–2013), Franklin & Bash (2012–2014), Grace and Frankie (2015–2020), and L.A.'s Finest (2019–2020).

He had a cameo as Patty Tolan's uncle in the remake of Ghostbusters (2016), and reprised his role as Winston in Ghostbusters: Afterlife (2021).

Early life
Hudson was born in Benton Harbor, Michigan. He never knew his father. His mother, Maggie Donald, died of tuberculosis when he was two months old. He was subsequently raised by his maternal grandmother, Arrana Donald.

Hudson joined the United States Marine Corps immediately after high school, but was discharged after only three months on medical grounds due to asthma. Having moved to Detroit, he became the resident playwright at Concept East, the oldest black theater company in the United States. He enrolled at Wayne State University to further develop his writing and acting skills, graduating in 1973. He established the Actors' Ensemble Theatre where he and other talented young black writers directed and appeared in their own works. He was briefly in a doctoral program at the University of Minnesota, Twin Cities before leaving to appear in a stage production of The Great White Hope. Later, he studied toward a Master of Fine Arts in acting at Yale School of Drama, but left after a year to appear in Leadbelly.

In an interview with Belief.net, Hudson stated that he is a practicing Christian, but does not believe that "one church is the right one".

Career

One of Hudson's early film roles is in Penitentiary II (1982) starring Leon Isaac Kennedy. He had various guest roles on television series such as The Dukes of Hazzard and The A-Team. He was on the television series Fantasy Island in a first-season episode as a voodoo man named Jamu. Hudson gained fame playing Winston Zeddemore in the 1984 feature film Ghostbusters and its 1989 sequel, Ghostbusters II. He auditioned to reprise the role for the animated series, The Real Ghostbusters, but it was given to Arsenio Hall. He had a major supporting role as the mentally challenged handyman Solomon in The Hand that Rocks the Cradle (1992).

Hudson was cast as Warden Leo Glynn on HBO's series Oz, and his son Ernie Hudson Jr. co-starred with him as Muslim inmate Hamid Khan. Hudson also appears as the character Munro in Congo (1995) and as Police Sergeant Albrecht in The Crow (1994). He switched gears when he played a preacher opening the eyes of a small town's prejudice in the 1950s in A Stranger in the Kingdom. He played Harry McDonald, the FBI superior of Sandra Bullock's character in the feature film Miss Congeniality (2000). He is in the Stargate SG-1 episode "Ethon" as Pernaux. He appeared as Reggie in the 1995 film The Basketball Diaries. In 2006, he appeared in the television movie The Ron Clark Story as Principal Turner. In 2008, he began a recurring role as Dr. Fields on The Secret Life of the American Teenager. He had a recurring role on the final season of Law & Order as Lt. Anita Van Buren's boyfriend and then fiancé.

In 2011, he played Stuart Owens in Torchwood: Miracle Day.

Beginning in 2015, Hudson was cast in a recurring role as Jacob, an organic farmer who is the romantic interest for Frankie Bergstein (Lily Tomlin) in the series Grace and Frankie.

Hudson appeared in the 2016 Ghostbusters reboot, playing Bill Jenkins, the uncle of Leslie Jones's lead character Pattie Tolan.

In 2019, Hudson began starring in L.A.'s Finest, playing the estranged father of Gabrielle Union's character. Hudson called it "a very different show", citing the duality of having to protect people as a member of law enforcement while having unresolved relationships that need to be reconciled. Spectrum canceled the series after two seasons the following year.

In August 2019, he confirmed his involvement in Ghostbusters: Afterlife directed by Jason Reitman, joining original cast members Sigourney Weaver, Dan Aykroyd, Bill Murray and Annie Potts. Hudson described himself as being welled by emotions after he put on his jumpsuit and proton pack, as he had previously "accepted that [a film] was never going to happen".

Hudson appeared in the 2022 drama film Prisoner's Daughter, alongside Kate Beckinsale and Brian Cox.

On March 8, 2022, Hudson was announced as the co-lead in NBC's Quantum Leap reboot.

In January 2023, Hudson guest voiced a character, Grini Millegi, a Dowutin gangster who was an associate of Cid and oversees Riot Racing on the planet Safa Toma, on Star Wars: The Bad Batch.

Personal life
Hudson married his first wife, Jeannie Moore, in 1963, when she was sixteen and he was eighteen. They had two sons, Ernie Hudson Jr. and Rahaman Hudson. When Hudson and Jeannie divorced in 1976, their sons moved to live with Hudson in California. In 1985, Hudson married former flight attendant Linda Kingsberg, and they had two sons, Andrew and Ross.

Filmography

Film

Television

Video games

References

External links

 
 
 
 Ernie Hudson Interview in Dangerous Ink Magazine – 2009
 Interview (March 2008) with Ernie Hudson, by Matthew Waldram
 

1945 births
20th-century African-American people
21st-century African-American people
20th-century American male actors
21st-century American male actors
African-American Christians
American male film actors
American male television actors
American male voice actors
African-American male actors
Living people
Male actors from Detroit
People from Benton Harbor, Michigan
United States Marines
Wayne State University alumni
Yale School of Drama alumni